Zhou, known in historiography as the Wu Zhou, Southern Zhou, Second Zhou or Restored Zhou, was a short-lived Chinese imperial dynasty that existed between 690 and 705, when Wu Zhao (commonly known as Wu Zetian) ruled as empress regnant. The dynasty began when Wu Zhao usurped the throne of her son, the Emperor Ruizong of Tang, and lasted until the Emperor Zhongzong of Tang was restored to the throne in the Shenlong Coup. Historians generally view the Wu Zhou as an interregnum of the Tang dynasty.

The sole ruler of Wu Zhou was Wu Zetian. She took the name "Wu Zhao" upon her coronation. Wu named her dynasty after the ancient Zhou dynasty, from whom she believed herself to be descended.

Background
Before her coronation, Wu Zhao (as she was then known), was often acting as de facto regent for her husband, Emperor Gaozong, or her sons, giving her a head-start in accomplishing her aims, which she then consolidated as huangdi of Zhou once she became ruler in name also. Beginning in 655, Wu began to preside over court meetings in the name of the emperor, and she co-ruled with Emperor Gaozong until his death. After Gaozong's death, she ruled in name of her sons, who reigned officially as puppet emperors, and power was completely and solely into the her hands. In 690, she deposed her son, Emperor Ruizong, and declared herself Huangdi (emperor) of her Zhou Dynasty.

History

The dynasty's capital was Shendu (神都 "Divine Capital", present-day Luoyang). Despite Wu's infamous rise to power, there is evidence that suggests women were granted more privileges during her reign, and China was in a state of great prosperity during her rule.

The dynasty's state religions were Buddhism and Daoism, both of which Wu Zetian exploited for self-promoting propaganda. The monk Xue Huaiyi claimed to have found a document predicting the reign of a woman of great merit who would become universal ruler   In support of her imperial ambitions, Wu Zetian also proclaimed herself "Sage Mother", having statues of Laozi's mother as "Sage Mother" placed in Daoist temples 

Wu Zetian became a very active supporter of Buddhism,  Furthermore, she claimed to be an incarnation of Maitreya, writing a document called the Great Cloud Sutra, which prophesied that a female emperor would eradicate illness, worry and disaster from the world. She sought the support of the Buddhist clergy to this end. In 673 Wu provided 20,000 cash for a gigantic statue of Maitreya at Longmen Grottoes. Unlike her predecessor's dynasty, Wu Zetian selected people in her government based on their skills, and not on their status. The Buddhist clergy created a document called Commentary on the Meaning of the Prophecy about Shenhuang, which predicted a female Chakravartin who would rule the Jambudvipa as the reincarnation of Vimalaprabha. This document was presented to Wu Zetian two months before the proclamation of the Zhou Dynasty.

Various other documents were also written such as The Great Spell of Unsullied Pure Light, also predicting the rise of a female monarch, of which Wu Zetian ordered 100,000 copies be printed and distributed.

Traditionalist Chinese historiography considers the dynasty as a period of the Tang dynasty, as Wu was also the former empress consort of a Tang emperor and was buried in Qianling Mausoleum, a Tang royal mausoleum. Furthermore, Wu Zetian was the only emperor of Zhou China, which does not fit the concept of a dynasty. There were, however, other dynasties of a similar length, such as the Xin dynasty, or much shorter in length, such as the Shun dynasty. Wu Zetian's rule was long also seen as a period of great tyranny, though in more recent decades this seems to have lessened or reversed, as the appearance of Wu Zetian in countless Chinese works of fiction seems to depict her as a wise ruler. Nevertheless, historically (rather than according to novels) her reign began and continued with extensive violence, combined with the use of secret police and a network of informers. The debate about Wu's use of violence and coercion is more as to how some of it may have been exaggerated and how much of it was necessary for her own survival, particularly given the animosity of the clans of old nobility  of the northern China plain that adamantly opposed her, together with a social and political system which found a woman of her accomplishments to be anathema solely on the basis of gender.

Achievements

The Wu Zhou dynasty had many achievements both in a broader historical sense as well as in contrast to the reigns of Emperors Zhongzong and Ruizong whose reigns bracketed hers, and in contrast to her weak and sickly husband Emperor Gaozong of Tang. Wu's reign resulted in  a greater level of Chinese imperial power both externally and internally. This was accomplished along with diminishing the power of the old official class, drawn from the traditionally powerful clans, thus greatly changing the dynamics of power in China. Wu Zetian greatly enhanced the prestige and effectiveness of the civil service recruitment tests, filling government positions by skills demonstrated in written examinations, and opening them up to men of all classes. She followed this with popular promotions and increased salaries. Wu issued Acts of Grace and other decrees of relief for the commons, and funded religious activities. However, toward the end of her reign she lost popular support due to the influence of the two young Zhang brothers she took as lovers and the resulting corruption in government. When her court officials intervened, they killed the Zhang brothers, Wu Zetian abdicated the next day, and the so-called Zhou dynasty fizzled to an end with the restoration of the Tang. Nevertheless, some of Wu Zetian's achievements have left their mark on history, such as the emphasis in subsequent Chinese history on merit-based examinations, as well as extant monuments, including huge parts of Longmen Grottoes. Wu Zetian was personally an author and poet, with many surviving works, including sixty-one essays under her name recorded in the Quan Tangwen "Collected Tang Essays" and forty-six  poems collected in the Quan Tangshi anthology of Tang poetry. Wu Zetian and her court left a remarkable legacy of poetry and literature from the end of Gaozu's reign and even more so during her Zhou dynasty period, during which the Zhuying ji poetry anthology was published, the poets of which were very influential to the subsequent flourishing of Tang poetry. Thus, though the Zhou dynasty failed to take root as an actual dynasty, it was one of the more important eras in Chinese history, and of influence on modern global culture.

See also
Wang Mang, who established the Xin dynasty, a similarly short-lived interregnum during the Han dynasty

References

Bibliography
Barrett, T. H. 2008. The Woman Who Discovered Printing. New Haven: Yale University Press. 
Paludan, Ann (1998). Chronicle of the Chinese Emperors: The Reign-by-Reign Record of the Rulers of Imperial China. New York, New York: Thames and Hudson. 

Dynasties in Chinese history
Former countries in Chinese history
Wu Zetian